Jerry Sullivan (born July 13, 1944) is a former American football coach who was an offensive assistant for the Arizona Cardinals of the National Football League (NFL). He's spent 25-years in the National Football League, 24 of them as a wide receivers coach. He also spent over 20-years as a college football coach.

Collegiate coaching career 
His first coaching job was with Kansas state in 1971. From 1973 to 1974, Sullivan was an assistant coach with the Texas Tech Red Raiders under head coach Jim Carlen. Sullivan then became wide receivers coach at South Carolina from 1976 to 1982. In 1983, he spent a one-season as the Indiana Hoosiers wide receivers coach. From 1984 to 1990, Sullivan moved to LSU as the wide receivers coach and he was also the wide receivers coach at Ohio State in 1991.

In 2017, Sullivan returned to the college ranks as a football consultant at LSU primarily focusing on wide receivers. On January 11, 2018, he moved to a full-time role on the coaching staff as senior offensive assistant/passing game coordinator. On January 9, 2019, Sullivan announced his retirement.

Professional coaching career
In 1992, Sullivan moved to the professional coaching ranks with the NFL San Diego Chargers. He remained Chargers wide receivers coach until 1996. He then became the Detroit Lions wide receivers coach from 1997 to 2000. Starting in 2001, he was wide receivers coach with the Arizona Cardinals for two-seasons before being promoted to offensive coordinator for the 2003 NFL Season. Sullivan then became the Miami Dolphins wide receivers coach in 2004 and from 2005 to 2010 he was the San Francisco 49ers wide receivers coach. From 2012 to 2016, he was the Jacksonville Jaguars wide receivers coach.

On August 12, 2019, it was announced Sullivan would rejoin the Cardinals as an offensive assistant & help coach the Cardinals' wide receivers. On May 10, 2022, it was announced Sullivan had retired again after the 2021 season.

References

1944 births
Living people
Arizona Cardinals coaches
Detroit Lions coaches
Florida State Seminoles football players
Indiana Hoosiers football coaches
Jacksonville Jaguars coaches
Kansas State Wildcats football coaches
LSU Tigers football coaches
Miami Dolphins coaches
National Football League offensive coordinators
Ohio State Buckeyes football coaches
San Diego Chargers coaches
San Francisco 49ers coaches
South Carolina Gamecocks football coaches
Texas Tech Red Raiders football coaches
Sports coaches from Miami
Players of American football from Miami